Vernon Lomax Smith (born January 1, 1927) is an American economist and professor of business economics and law at Chapman University. He was formerly a professor of economics at the University of Arizona, professor of economics and law at George Mason University, and a board member of the Mercatus Center. Along with Daniel Kahneman, Smith shared the 2002 Nobel Memorial Prize in Economic Sciences for his contributions to behavioral economics and his work in the field of experimental economics. He worked to establish 'laboratory experiments as a tool in empirical economic analysis, especially in the study of alternative market mechanisms'.

Smith is the founder and president of the International Foundation for Research in Experimental Economics, a Member of the Board of Advisors for The Independent Institute, a Senior Fellow at the Cato Institute in Washington D.C. In 2004 Smith was honored with an honorary doctoral degree at Universidad Francisco Marroquín, the institution that named the Vernon Smith Center for Experimental Economics Research after him. He was also a founding board member of the Center for Growth and Opportunity at Utah State University.

Early life and education
Smith was born in Wichita, Kansas, where he attended Wichita North High School and Friends University. Grover Bougher, Vernon's mother's first husband, who worked as a fireman on the Santa Fe railroad, died in a tragic accident which proved to be pivotal. The life insurance money provided by the Santa Fe railroad was invested in a farm which became the sole means of survival for Vernon's family during the tough years of the Great Depression. While the farm brought hard work and hard times for Vernon's parents, Vernon liked the adventurous experiences. His life-long interest in learning how things work was kindled by his childhood at the farm.

Smith received his bachelor's degree in electrical engineering from Caltech in 1949, an M.A. in economics from the University of Kansas in 1952, and his Ph.D. in economics from Harvard University in 1955.

Academic career
Smith's first teaching post was at the Krannert School of Management, Purdue University, which he held from 1955 until 1967, attaining the rank of full professor.

Smith also taught as a visiting associate professor at Stanford University (1961–1962) and there made contact with Sidney Siegel, who was also doing work in experimental economics. Smith moved with his family to Massachusetts and got a position first at Brown University (1967–1968) and then at the University of Massachusetts (1968–1972). Smith also received appointments at the Center for Advanced Study in the Behavioral Sciences (1972–1973) and Caltech (1973–1975).

Much of the research that earned Smith the Nobel Memorial Prize in Economic Sciences was conducted at the University of Arizona between 1976 and 2001. In 2001, Smith left Arizona for George Mason University. From 2003 to 2006, he held the Rasmuson Chair of Economics at the University of Alaska Anchorage. In 2008, Smith founded the Economic Science Institute at Chapman University in Orange, California.

Smith has served on the board of editors of the American Economic Review, the Cato Journal, Journal of Economic Behavior and Organization, Science, Economic Theory, Economic Design, and the Journal of Economic Methodology. He also served as an expert for the Copenhagen Consensus.

Academic work

It was at Purdue that Smith's work in experimental economics began. As Smith describes it:

In framing the experiment, Smith varied certain institutional parameters seen in the first classroom economics experiments as conducted by Edward Chamberlin: in particular, he ran the experiments for several trading periods, to give the student subjects time to train.

At Caltech, Charles Plott encouraged Smith to formalize the methodology of experimental economics, which he did in two articles. In 1976, "Experimental Economics: Induced Value Theory" was published in the American Economic Review (AER). It was the first articulation of the principle behind economic experiments. Six years later, these principles were expanded in "Microeconomic Systems as an Experimental Science," also in the AER. This paper adapts the principles of mechanism design, a microeconomic system developed by Leonid Hurwicz, to the development of economic experiments. In Hurwicz's formulation, a microeconomic system consists of an economic environment, an economic institution (or economic mechanism), and an economic outcome. The economic environment is simply the preferences of the people in the economy and the production capabilities of the firms in the economy. The key insight in this formulation is that the economic outcome can be affected by the economic institution. The mechanism design provides a formal means for tests of the performance of an economic institution, and experimental economics, as developed by Smith, provided a means for formal empirical assessment of the performance of economic institutions. The second main contribution of the paper is to the technique of induced values, the method used in controlled laboratory experiments in economics, political science, and psychology, which allows experimental economists to create a replica of a market in a laboratory. Subjects in an experiment are told that they can produce a "commodity" at a cost and then sell it to buyers. The seller earns the difference between the price received and its cost. Buyers are told that the commodity has a value to them when they consume it, and they earn the difference between the value of the commodity to them and its price. Using the technique, Smith and his coauthors have examined the performance of alternative trading mechanisms in resource allocation.

In February 2011, Smith participated in the "Visiting Scholars Series" at the Nicholas Academic Centers in Santa Ana, California, conducted in collaboration with Chapman University. Smith and his colleague Bart Wilson conducted experiments designed to expose high school students from underserved neighborhoods to market dynamics and how concepts such as altruism influence economic behavior.

Smith has authored or coauthored articles and books on capital theory, finance, natural resource economics and experimental economics. He was also one of the first to propose the combinatorial auction design, with Stephen J. Rassenti and Robert L. Bulfin in 1982.

In January 2009, Smith signed a public petition opposing the passage of the American Recovery and Reinvestment Act. In a 2010 Econ Journal Watch study, Smith was found to be one of the most active petition-signers among US economists.

The Vernon Smith Prize for the Advancement of Austrian Economics is named after him and is sponsored by the European Center of Austrian Economics.

Personal life 
In February 2005, Smith publicly attributed features of his personality to Asperger's syndrome after a process of self-diagnosis.

Works
 
 
 
 Plott, Charles R., and Vernon L. Smith, ed. (2008). Handbook of Experimental Economics Results, v. 1, Elsevier. Description and preview.
 
 
 _ (1976). 
 
 _ (1982). 
 _ (1991). Papers in Experimental Economics [1962–88],  Cambridge. Description and chapter-preview links.
 _ (2000). Bargaining and Market Behavior: Essays in Experimental Economics [1990–98], Cambridge. Description and chapter-preview links.
 _ (2003). 
 _ ([1987] 2008a). "experimental methods in economics." The New Palgrave Dictionary of Economics, 2nd Edition, Abstract.
 _ (2008b). "experimental economics," The New Palgrave Dictionary of Economics, 2nd Edition, Abstract.
  Reprinted in Timothy N. Cason and Charles Noussair, ed. (2001), Advances in Experimental Markets, pp. 15– 32.

See also
 List of economists

Notes

External links

 Dr. Vernon L Smith at Chapman University School of Law
 Member of the Board of Advisors at The Independent Institute
 Senior Fellow at Cato Institute

Articles
 "Default is not the end of the world" Interview with Vernon Smith by Luis Martin (Winter 2011)
 Reflections On Human Action After 50 Years by Vernon L. Smith, Cato Journal, Fall 1999
 "Using Experiments to Inform the Privatization/Deregulation Movement in Electricity," by Stephen J.Rassenti, Vernon L. Smith, and Bart J.Wilson, Cato Journal, Winter 2002
 The Clinton Housing Bubble, Vernon L. Smith, The Wall Street Journal, December 18, 2007
 From Bubble to Depression?, Steven Gjerstad and Vernon L. Smith, The Wall Street Journal, April 6, 2009

1927 births
American libertarians
American Nobel laureates
Brown University faculty
California Institute of Technology alumni
California Institute of Technology faculty
Cato Institute people
Earhart Foundation Fellows
Chapman University faculty
Environmental economists
Experimental economists
Fellows of the Econometric Society
Financial economists
Friends University alumni
George Mason University faculty
Harvard University alumni
Libertarian economists
Members of the United States National Academy of Sciences
Nobel laureates in Economics
People from Wichita, Kansas
Krannert School of Management faculty
Stanford University faculty
University of Arizona people
University of Kansas alumni
University of Massachusetts Amherst faculty
Center for Advanced Study in the Behavioral Sciences fellows
Living people
Distinguished Fellows of the American Economic Association
Mercatus Center
Economists from Arizona
Economists from Kansas
Nancy L. Schwartz Memorial Lecture speakers
Member of the Mont Pelerin Society